Gourdie House is an historic building in Craigie, Perth and Kinross, Scotland. It is a Category A listed building dating to 1765.

The building is two storeys and basement, centre gabled and harled with quoins.

See also
List of Category A listed buildings in Perth and Kinross

References

Category A listed buildings in Perth and Kinross
1765 establishments in Scotland